Captain Saralee Thungthongkam (born 13 June 1979) is a Thai retired badminton player. She graduated with a master's degree in Communication Arts from Bangkok University.

Career 
Thungthongkam made her debut at the Olympic Games in 2000 Sydney. She reached the second round in both the women's and mixed doubles with partners Sujitra Ekmongkolpaisarn and Khunakorn Sudhisodhi.

Thungthongkam competed in 2004 Athens Olympics in the women's doubles with partner Sathinee Chankrachangwong. They defeated Denyse Julien and Anna Rice of Canada in the first round and Chikako Nakayama and Keiko Yoshimoti of Japan in the second. In the quarter finals, Thungthongkam and Chankrachangwong lost to Yang Wei and Zhang Jiewen of China 2–15, 4–15. She also competed in the mixed doubles with partner Sudket Prapakamol. They had a bye in the first run and were defeated by Fredrik Bergström and Johanna Persson of Sweden in the 16th round.

At the 2008 Beijing, she only competed in the mixed doubles, again with Prapakamol. They reached the quarter finals, losing to the Indonesian pair of Nova Widianto and Liliyana Natsir, who went on to win the silver medal.

Thungthongkam made her fourth appearance Olympic Games in 2012 London, where she again reached the quarter finals with Prapakamol. This time they lost to Christinna Pedersen and Joachim Fischer Nielsen of Denmark.

Thungthongkam ended her career in the international tournaments after got injured at the Thailand Masters in February 2016. She spent 19 years at the Thailand national team.

Achievements

World Championships 
Mixed doubles

World Cup 
Mixed doubles

Asian Games 
Mixed doubles

Asian Championships 
Women's doubles

Mixed doubles

Southeast Asian Games 
Women's doubles

Mixed doubles

BWF Superseries 
The BWF Superseries, which was launched on 14 December 2006 and implemented in 2007, was a series of elite badminton tournaments, sanctioned by the Badminton World Federation (BWF). BWF Superseries levels were Superseries and Superseries Premier. A season of Superseries consisted of twelve tournaments around the world that had been introduced since 2011. Successful players were invited to the Superseries Finals, which were held at the end of each year.

Mixed doubles

  BWF Superseries Finals tournament
  BWF Superseries Premier tournament
  BWF Superseries tournament

BWF Grand Prix 
The BWF Grand Prix had two levels, the Grand Prix and Grand Prix Gold. It was a series of badminton tournaments sanctioned by the Badminton World Federation (BWF) and played between 2007 and 2017. The World Badminton Grand Prix was sanctioned by the International Badminton Federation from 1983 to 2006.

Women's doubles

Mixed doubles

 BWF Grand Prix Gold tournament
 BWF & IBF Grand Prix tournament

IBF International
Mixed doubles

References

External links 

1979 births
Living people
Saralee Thungthongkam
Saralee Thungthongkam
Badminton players at the 2000 Summer Olympics
Badminton players at the 2004 Summer Olympics
Badminton players at the 2008 Summer Olympics
Badminton players at the 2012 Summer Olympics
Saralee Thungthongkam
Badminton players at the 1998 Asian Games
Badminton players at the 2002 Asian Games
Badminton players at the 2006 Asian Games
Badminton players at the 2010 Asian Games
Badminton players at the 2014 Asian Games
Saralee Thungthongkam
Saralee Thungthongkam
Asian Games medalists in badminton
Medalists at the 2002 Asian Games
Medalists at the 2006 Asian Games
Medalists at the 2010 Asian Games
Competitors at the 1997 Southeast Asian Games
Competitors at the 1999 Southeast Asian Games
Competitors at the 2001 Southeast Asian Games
Competitors at the 2003 Southeast Asian Games
Competitors at the 2005 Southeast Asian Games
Competitors at the 2007 Southeast Asian Games
Competitors at the 2009 Southeast Asian Games
Competitors at the 2011 Southeast Asian Games
Saralee Thungthongkam
Saralee Thungthongkam
Saralee Thungthongkam
Southeast Asian Games medalists in badminton
Saralee Thungthongkam
Saralee Thungthongkam